Dukmasov is a rural locality (a khutor) and the administrative center of Dukmasovskoye Rural Settlement of Shovgenovsky District, the Republic of Adygea, Russia. The population was 478 as of 2018. There are 12  streets.

Geography 
Dukmasov is located 29 km west of Khakurinokhabl (the district's administrative centre) by road. Mokronazarov is the nearest rural locality.

References 

Rural localities in Shovgenovsky District